Annie is a 1999 American musical-comedy-drama television film from The Wonderful World of Disney, adapted from the 1977 Broadway musical of the same name by Charles Strouse, Martin Charnin, and Thomas Meehan, which in turn is based on the 1924 Little Orphan Annie comic strip by Harold Gray.  It is the first remake and the second film adaptation of the musical following the 1982 theatrical film starring Aileen Quinn, Carol Burnett, and Albert Finney.

It was directed by Rob Marshall, written by Irene Mecchi, and produced by Walt Disney Television, Columbia TriStar Television, Storyline Entertainment, and Chris Montan Productions. Annie marks the first film collaboration between The Walt Disney Company and Columbia Pictures since Columbia distributed Disney's Silly Symphony film series as well as the Mickey Mouse cartoon series from 1929 to 1932. It stars Kathy Bates, Alan Cumming, Audra McDonald, Kristin Chenoweth, Victor Garber, Andrea McArdle, and introduces Alicia Morton as the titular character, Lalaine as Kate, Danielle Wilson as Duffy, Sarah Hyland as Molly, Erin Adams as Tessie, Nanea Miyata as July, and Marissa Rago as Pepper.

Annie premiered on ABC on November 7, 1999. The program, which was a rare partnership between Columbia TriStar Television and Walt Disney Television, proved to be popular during its initial airing, with an estimated 26.3 million viewers, making it the second-most-watched Disney film ever to air on ABC behind Cinderella (1997). This version earned two Emmy Awards and a George Foster Peabody Award. It would be followed by a third film adaptation of the musical in 2014 and a fourth adaptation that was a live NBC production of the musical.

Plot
In 1933, during the Great Depression, 11-year-old orphan Annie Bennett was left on her own at the NYC Municipal Orphange Girls Annex when she was an infant. The only two things that she received from her family was half a heart-shaped locket with a key hole, and a note from her parents saying that they would come back for her. The orphanage is run by the tyrannical Miss Hannigan, who starves the orphans, and forces them to do slave labor. In the middle of the night, after getting tired of waiting for her parents, Annie tries to escape to find them, but is caught by Miss Hannigan in the process. When Miss Hannigan gets distracted, Annie hides in the dirty laundry bin and she finally succeeds in running away.

While out on her own, Annie befriends a dog, whom she names Sandy. But police officer Lt. Ward catches her and returns her  to the orphanage. When billionaire Oliver "Daddy" Warbucks decides to take in an orphan for Christmas, his secretary Grace Farrell chooses Annie. Annie and Sandy are brought to his wealthy estate and bathe in a grand life.

Although at first uncomfortable with Annie, Daddy Warbucks is soon charmed by her. He desperately wants to adopt Annie, but Annie still wants to find her real parents, so he announces on the radio a $50,000 reward for anybody who can prove they are her biological parents. The orphans accidentally tell Miss Hannigan, and her younger con artist brother Rooster, and his dimwitted girlfriend Lily St. Regis cook up a scheme to get the reward by posing as Ralph and Shirley Mudge (Annie's "so called" parents).

Lily is left with the orphans after Miss Hannigan and Rooster leave, but Lily accidentally tells the secret. The orphans make her tell them what is going on, and she realizes that Rooster could leave her hanging as he has done before in the past. She and the orphans come to Warbucks' mansion where Lily demands her part in the cut while the orphans reveal the scheme. While fleeing from the orphans, Miss Hannigan and Rooster are intercepted upon the arrival of President Franklin D. Roosevelt along with his Secret Service. President Roosevelt reads the papers that identify Miss Hannigan, Rooster, and Lily leading to Rooster and Lily getting arrested by the Secret Service. This enrages Miss Hannigan, who rants about all she did and the thanks she got for it. She is then carted off to a psychiatric hospital as she foresaw what would happen to her.

President Roosevelt then presents the evidence to Annie that her real parents are actually David and Margaret Bennett, but sadly they both had died several years earlier which explains why they never returned for her. Although Annie is saddened that her real parents are dead, she is cheered up when Daddy Warbucks officially adopts her and Molly. President Roosevelt ensures a happy ending for all as he promises that each of the other orphans will be adopted by a stable and happy family. Daddy Warbucks and Grace become engaged, and Annie and Molly live happily with their new parents and Sandy.

Cast
 Victor Garber as Mr. Oliver "Daddy" Warbucks, a lonely billionaire businessman who opens his heart to Annie and becomes her adoptive father.
 Alicia Morton as Annie Bennett Warbucks, an optimistic 11-year-old orphan searching for her biological parents. Oliver and Grace adopted her, and she became their adoptive daughter.
 Audra McDonald as Miss Grace Farrell, Personal Secretary (later wife) to Daddy Warbucks. She eventually fell in love with Daddy Warbucks and becomes Annie's adoptive mother.
 Kathy Bates as Miss Agatha Hannigan/Mrs. Shirley Mudge (disguise), the cruel owner of the orphanage where Annie lives.
 Alan Cumming as Daniel Francis "Rooster" Hannigan/Danny the Dip/Mr. Ralph Mudge (disguise), Agatha's dastardly younger brother and con-artist.
 Kristin Chenoweth as Lily St. Regis/Sadie Algonquin/Phyllis the Filcher, Rooster's girlfriend.

The Orphans
 Erin Adams as Tessie, the 8 year old orphan with mood swings. Tessie goes from being happy one minute and worrisome the next. She is known for saying, "Oh my goodness."
 Sarah Hyland as Molly, the youngest of the orphans. Molly is 7 years old and has a cute doll. She also gets adopted by Oliver Warbucks and Grace Farrell and becomes Annie's little sister.
 Lalaine as Katherine "Kate", the tomboyish Mexican-American orphan who is friends with Annie. Kate is shy, is 11 years old and wears glasses.
 Nanea Miyata as July, the motherly orphan. July is the oldest orphan. July is 13 years old and has a doll too.
 Marissa Rago as Pepper, the second oldest orphan. Pepper is bossy and thinks that she's too old to be adopted. Pepper is 12 years old.
 Danielle Wilson as Duffy, the 10 year old African American orphan with a talent for singing. Duffy dreams of being famous. Duffy is loud and confident.

Recurring cast
 Andrea McArdle as Star-To-Be (McArdle originated the role of Annie in the musical)
 Dennis Howard as Franklin D. Roosevelt, the President of the United States.
 Douglas Fisher as Drake
 Kurt Knudson as Justice Brandeis
 Ernie Sabella as Mr. Bundles, the laundry man.
 Chester and Chip as Sandy, a stray dog who Annie adopts.
 Vic Polizos as Lt. Ward (credited as "Beat Cop"), a police lieutenant who returns Annie to Miss Hannigan.
 Chester and Chip as Sandy the dog

Musical numbers

The film's soundtrack was released on November 2, 1999, by Walt Disney Records.

The songs in this version reflect those of the original 1977 production, but does not include "We'd Like to Thank You, Herbert Hoover", "Tomorrow (Cabinet Reprise)", "Annie", or "New Deal for Christmas". However, it does include a reprise of "N.Y.C." and of "Little Girls" that takes place at the end of the film, rather than after the song itself.

 "Overture"
 "Maybe" - Annie
 "It's the Hard Knock Life" - Annie and Orphans
 "It's the Hard Knock Life" (Reprise) - Orphans
 "Tomorrow" - Annie
 "Little Girls" - Miss Hannigan
 "I Think I'm Gonna Like It Here" - Grace, Annie, and Warbucks' Staff
 "N.Y.C." - Warbucks, Grace, Annie, and Star-to-Be
 "N.Y.C." (Reprise) - Warbucks
 "Lullaby" - Warbucks
 "Easy Street" - Rooster, Miss Hannigan, and Lily
 "Maybe" (Reprise 1) - Annie
 "You're Never Fully Dressed Without a Smile" - Bert Healy and the Boylan Sisters
 "You're Never Fully Dressed Without a Smile" (Reprise) - Orphans
 "Something Was Missing" - Warbucks
 "I Don't Need Anything But You" - Warbucks and Annie
 "Maybe" (Reprise 2) - Grace
 "Tomorrow" (Reprise) - Grace
 "Little Girls" (Reprise) - Miss Hannigan
 "Finale: I Don't Need Anything But You" (Reprise) - Warbucks, Grace, and Annie

Production
ABC began work on the film following the success of Cinderella. Although the stage musical Annie had already been adapted as a film in 1982, the film was considered to be a critical and commercial failure. Zadan and Meron saw remaking the musical as an opportunity to rectify the previous adaptation's errors. They enlisted Cinderella's choreographer Rob Marshall to direct and making the orphans ethnically diverse. Zadan and Meron were both so impressed by Rob's work throughout Cinderella (saying he acted like a director), that when The Wonderful World of Disney came to them about doing a TV version of Annie, they both went to Marshall to direct and choreograph. At first, he turned it down, saying "I'm not a director, I'm a choreographer. I don't know why you're even offering me this movie. I don't know anything about film." When Rob Marshall finally agreed to direct it, Disney executives didn’t want him to do the film. They said "Annie is too valuable a property. We're not gonna give it to a guy who's never directed a movie." Yet, because Zadan and Meron both really believed in him, they told the executives in response "Then we won’t produce it." They knew at the time that since Cinderella was so huge, the last thing Disney wanted to do was another musical not produced by them. So they kept calling saying "Let's go over a list of directors", but Zadan and Meron said no because they really wanted Rob Marshall to do it. So Disney eventually conceded and allowed him to direct and choreograph. Filming began in June 1999, and took place entirely on location in Los Angeles.

When it came to casting Lily St. Regis, the network wanted Ginger Spice to play that part. Yet, it was Rob Marshall who successfully fought for Kristin Chenoweth despite her mainly being a Broadway name at the time. McDonald recalled in a 2017 interview that there was a reshoot of the final scene that showed her character, a black woman, getting engaged to Daddy Warbucks; she suggested the reason for the reshoots was Disney and ABC were "a little uncomfortable" having a black woman being engaged to the white man. However, the other members of the cast and crew were not happy about having to do the reshoot, and Garber intentionally performed the scene badly so that it couldn't make it into the final cut.

The dancers' costumes and the stage set of the Broadway section of "N.Y.C." are taken directly from the "Broadway Melody" ballet in Singin' in the Rain.

This was the second time Kathy Bates and Victor Garber starred alongside each other in a film. They had previously appeared in James Cameron's 1997 disaster epic film Titanic.

Release
Annie premiered as part of The Wonderful World of Disney on ABC on November 7, 1999. After its premiere on ABC, the film aired on cable channels such as ABC Family, Starz, and the Hallmark Channel.

Home media
Annie was released on VHS on December 14, 1999 and on DVD on January 24, 2000 by Walt Disney Studios Home Entertainment. The film has not been released on Blu-ray but was available to stream on Disney+ for a limited time.

Reception
The program proved to be popular during its initial airing, with an estimated 26.3 million viewers, making it the second-most-watched Disney movie ever to air on ABC behind Cinderella (1997). This film was praised for its casting and for being closer to the stage production than the 1982 film.

Awards and nominations

See also
 Annie Jr. - School and amateur productions of Annie.
 Annie (1982 film)
 Annie (2014 film) - Modernized re-imagining loosely based on the same story
 Annie (musical) - The musical which the films are based on.
 Little Orphan Annie - The Harold Gray comic strip from which the whole Annie universe is based.

References

External links
 

1999 television films
1999 films
1999 comedy-drama films
1990s American films
1990s English-language films
1990s musical comedy-drama films
ABC network original films
American comedy-drama television films
American musical comedy-drama films
American musical television films
Cultural depictions of Franklin D. Roosevelt
Disney television films
Films about adoption
Films about child labour
Films about orphans
Films based on adaptations
Films based on American comics
Films based on comic strips
Films based on Little Orphan Annie
Films based on musicals
Films directed by Rob Marshall
Films set in 1933
Films set in New York City
Films shot in Los Angeles
Films with screenplays by Irene Mecchi
Great Depression films
Live-action films based on comics
Peabody Award-winning broadcasts
Walt Disney anthology television series episodes